The Texas Tech University Health Sciences Center (TTUHSC) is a public medical school based in Lubbock, Texas, with additional campuses in Abilene, Amarillo, Dallas, and the Permian Basin. TTUHSC serves more than 100 counties in the western portion of Texas. The university is a separate institution from Texas Tech University; both universities are among five universities that are part of the Texas Tech University System. Texas Tech University Health Sciences Center El Paso, founded in 1969 as a branch campus of TTUHSC, became a separate institution in 2013.

Schools

Biomedical sciences 
The Graduate School of Biomedical Sciences (GSBS) has campuses in Lubbock, Abilene, and Amarillo. The school offers doctoral and master's degrees in biomedical sciences, as well as professional certificates and dual degrees in collaboration with the School of Medicine.

Health professions 
The school began in 1983 as the School of Allied Health Sciences and currently has campuses in Amarillo, Lubbock, and the Permian Basin. More than 1,800 students are currently enrolled in 20 different degree programs at the doctoral, master's and baccalaureate degree levels. These programs include areas of study, such as athletic training, audiology, clinical management, medical laboratory science, molecular pathology, physical and occupational therapy, physician assistant, rehabilitation, and speech-language pathology.

Medicine 

The Texas Tech University Health Sciences Center School of Medicine in Lubbock has awarded more than 3,000 Doctor of Medicine degrees since its first graduating class in 1974. The school was commissioned to train physicians to help meet the health care needs of residents of West Texas, a population that now includes more than 2.5 million people. When the school opened, West Texas had one physician for every 1,300 residents. Currently, the ratio is about one physician for every 750 residents. Students spend their first two years of study in Lubbock and their last two years studying in Amarillo, Odessa or Lubbock. A self-proclaimed major initiative for the school is to "recruit creative, innovative research faculty and to develop graduate students and postdoctoral fellows for lifelong careers in medical research."

Nursing 
The school has campuses in Lubbock, Permian Basin, Highland Lakes, and Abilene; and it educates more than 1,000 students each year. Bachelors, masters, and doctoral degrees in nursing are issued by the school. The School of Nursing offers the only Doctor of Nursing Practice program in West Texas. The school is known for its alternatives to traditional educational opportunities including online coursework for a registered nurse to obtain a Bachelor of Science in Nursing, a second-degree Bachelor of Science in Nursing program for students with a bachelor's degree in another subject, and a Veteran to Bachelor of Science in Nursing degree for veterans with military medical experience who wish to earn a nursing degree but already have considerable knowledge that distinguishes them from a traditional nursing student.

Pharmacy 
The School of Pharmacy's administrative hub is located in Amarillo and the school has regional campus sites in Lubbock, Dallas and Abilene. The school has two Dallas-area regional sites: one located on the grounds of the North Texas Veterans Administration Medical Center and the second located within the central Dallas medical district.

Lubbock faculty and residents also operate the TTUHSC Pharmacy, which provides medications and biologicals to the Texas Department of Criminal Justice Montford Unit Regional Medical Facility; the TTUHSC International Pain Institute; the Garrison Geriatric Education and Care Center; and TTUHSC clinics in Lubbock, Odessa and El Paso. The TTUHSC Pharmacy also provides telepharmacy services to the rural communities of Turkey and Earth, Texas. The first telepharmacy prescription dispensed in Texas occurred September 18, 2002, between the TTUHSC Pharmacy and the Turkey Medical Clinic.
 Department of Pharmacy Practice
 Department of Pharmaceutical Sciences
 Department of Biomedical Sciences

Public health 
The Julia Jones Matthews School of Population and Public Health is located on the Abilene and Lubbock campuses.

Campuses

Institutes and centers 
 F. Marie Hall Institute for Rural and Community Health
 Garrison Institute on Aging (GIA)
 The Institute of Environmental and Human Health (TIEHH)
 Laura W. Bush Institute for Women's Health (LWBIWH)
 Center of Excellence for Geriatric Scholarship, Training, and Faculty Development
 Center of Excellence in Evidence-Based Practice (CEEBP)
 Center for Innovation in Nursing Education (CINE)
 Center for International and Multicultural Affairs (CIMA)
 Center for Membrane Protein Research
 Center for Rehabilitation Research
 Pediatric Pharmacology Research and Development Center
 School of Medicine Cancer Center
 School of Pharmacy Cancer Biology Center (CBC)
 South Plains Alcohol and Addiction Research Center (SPAARC)
 University Medical Center Southwest Cancer Treatment Center
 Vascular Drug Research Center
 West Texas Influenza Center

Objectives 
The presence of TTUHSC has impacted the access to health care in West Texas. Over 20% of the physicians currently practicing in West Texas are TTUHSC medical school or residency graduates. The schools of Nursing and Health Professions impact West Texas, with most of their graduates remaining in West Texas to pursue their chosen profession. Over 80% of School of Pharmacy graduates have chosen to practice in Texas.

Traditions

White Coat ceremony 
Usually held in August, a new group of first-year medical students participate in the White Coat Ceremony each year. This event is a rite of passage for first-year medical students as they don their coats and take a Hippocratic oath affirming their commitment to the highest standards of ethics and patient care. At the TTUHSC School of Medicine in Lubbock, the ceremony is held at the Lubbock Memorial Civic Center.

People

Alumni

 Donna Campbell, member of the Texas Senate, is an emergency room physician from New Braunfels. She graduated from Texas Tech with her M.D. in 1989.
 Bernard A. Harris Jr. graduated from the SOM in 1982 before becoming an astronaut with NASA and has spent more than 400 hours in space.

Faculty
 Bernard T. Mittemeyer
 Tom Shires
 Amy Doneen, DNP

Presidents
 David R. Smith (1996 – Sept 2001)
 M. Roy Wilson (Jun 2003 – Jun 2006
 Bernhard T. Mittemeyer [(interim) Jul 2006–]
 John C. Baldwin (Jul 2007 – Sept 2009)
 Tedd L. Mitchell (May 2010–2019)
 Lori Rice-Spearman (2020–present)

References

External links
 

 
Public universities and colleges in Texas
Texas Tech University Health Sciences Center
Universities and colleges accredited by the Southern Association of Colleges and Schools
1979 establishments in Texas
Medical schools in Texas